The United States Customs District of Barnstable was an administrative area for the collection of import duties on foreign goods that entered the United States by ship at the port of Barnstable, Massachusetts. Established in 1789, it was abolished in 1913. Today the port of Barnstable is administered by the Boston Customs District.

History 
The District of Barnstable was established in the fifth statute passed by the First Congress in 1789 (ch.5). This act provided for the collection of the duties that had been laid down in the Hamilton Tariff earlier that year. The town of Barnstable was designated as the port of entry for the district. The towns of Sandwich, Harwich, Wellfleet, Provincetown and Chatham were designated as ports of delivery only. The district included all shores and waters within the county of Barnstable, excepting the town of Falmouth. A collector for the district was appointed, to reside at Barnstable.

Customs House 

Customs activities took place in the collector's home until the mid-19th century when collector Sylvanus B. Phinney secured congressional funding to erect a fireproof, brick and cast iron customshouse/post office in 1855. Ammi Burnham Young, Supervising Architect of the Treasury Department, designed the two-story, Renaissance Revival style building with an advanced cast-iron structural system in 1856.
The customshouse occupied the second level until 1913, when Barnstable ceased to be a customs district in its own right. The first level continued to serve as a post office until 1958. The federal government deeded the building and grounds to the town of Barnstable in 1960 for use as a historical museum, which opened that same year. The building is dedicated to Donald G. Trayser, a local Barnstable historian, former editor of The Barnstable Patriot, former Clerk of the Barnstable Superior Court, and editor of Barnstable - Three Centuries of a Cape Cod Town, which was published in 1939. For many years, the historic building housed the collection of the Barnstable Historical Society. After the Society moved out, the customhouse was restored by a group of dedicated local residents and reopened as the Coast Guard Heritage Museum at the Trayser in July 2005.

Officers 
The position of collector was appointed by the President, subject to confirmation by the Senate. From 1820 onward, collectors were limited to four-year commissions, at the end of which they needed to be reappointed by the President. They could also be removed from office at any time at the pleasure of the President.

Collector for the District (1789 - 1913)

Notes

References 

United States Customs Service